The 2015 Ohio Valley Conference (OVC) softball tournament was held at Cougar Field in Edwardsville, Illinois, home of Southern Illinois University Edwardsville, from May 6 through May 9, 2015. The tournament winner earned the OVC's automatic bid to the 2015 NCAA Division I softball tournament. All games were streamed courtesy of the OVC Digital Network.

Tournament

All times listed are Central Daylight Time.

References

Tournament
Ohio Valley Conference softball tournament